Damien Francis Tudehope (born 1953) is an Australian politician. Tudehope has served as the New South Wales Minister for Finance in the second Berejiklian and Perrottet ministries since April 2019. He is also the Minister for Employee Relations, the Vice-President of the Executive Council, and the Leader of the Government in the Legislative Council in the Perrottet ministry since December 2021. Tudehope has been a member of the New South Wales Legislative Council since the 2019 state election, representing the Liberal Party.

Tudehope was the New South Wales Legislative Assembly member for Epping from March 2015 until March 2019, representing the Liberal Party

Early life and education
Tudehope was educated at the University of Sydney where he received a Bachelor of  Arts and a Bachelor of Laws. He has been a small business owner, worked as the chief of staff for the former Attorney-General Greg Smith in the O'Farrell ministry, and as a partner at O'Hara and Company Solicitors.

As a lawyer, Tudehope successfully defended the later-convicted child sex offender priest Finian Egan against sexual abuse charges. Later, as chief of staff to the Attorney General, Tudehope blocked release of material regarding Egan for a subsequent trial. On that occasion in 2013, Egan was represented by Tudehope's brother, Anthony Tudehope. Egan was found guilty and jailed.

Political career 
Tudehope has acted as spokesperson for the socially conservative Australian Family Association. He was previously the State President of the National Civic Council. He ran against the Liberal Party in 1999 as the Australian Family Alliance candidate for the NSW Legislative Council, and has nominated for the seats of Baulkham Hills, Ryde and Epping for the Liberal Party, although he withdrew each time before the preselection stage.

Tudehope was endorsed by the Liberal Party for the state seat of Epping following Greg Smith's retirement from politics. At the 2015 state election, Tudehope achieved 54.3% of the primary vote, the second-highest primary vote in the history of the seat of Epping. In his inaugural speech, Tudehope cited housing affordability as a key issue that needed addressing. On 3 June 2015 Tudehope was appointed Chair for the Parliamentary Committee on the Independent Commission Against Corruption, and Deputy Chair for the Parliamentary Committee on Children and Young People.

In an agreement reached between Tudehope and Dominic Perrottet, Tudehope agreed to not contest the seat of Epping at the 2019 state election, allowing Perrottet the opportunity to move from Hawkesbury to contest Epping. In exchange, Tudehope sought Liberal Party endorsement for the Legislative Council. However, in November 2018, Liberal Party members voted against the deal. Tudehope eventually gained endorsement and was elected to the Legislative Council in March 2019. Tudehope was appointed as the Minister for Finance and Small Business in April 2019.

In April 2020, Don Harwin resigned from his portfolios including Vice-President of the Executive Council and Leader of the Government in the Legislative Council. Tudehope was appointed Vice-President of the Executive Council and Leader of the Government in the Legislative Council between 15 April 2020 and 3 July 2020, after which Harwin's portfolios were reinstated. Tudehope was then appointed as Leader of the House in the Legislative Council. In the December 2021 rearrangement of the Perrottet ministry, Tudehope was sworn in as the Minister for Finance, the Minister for Employee Relations, the Vice-President of the Executive Council, and the Leader of the Government in the Legislative Council.

Personal life
Tudehope lives in West Pennant Hills with wife Diane, and has nine children, born between 1979 and 2000, including Monica, Dominic Perrottet's Deputy Chief of Staff and Executive Director Policy. Damien Tudehope is a Roman Catholic.

See also

Second Berejiklian ministry
Perrottet ministry

References

	
 

Living people
Liberal Party of Australia members of the Parliament of New South Wales
Members of the New South Wales Legislative Assembly
Members of the New South Wales Legislative Council
Australian solicitors
Sydney Law School alumni
University of Sydney alumni
Place of birth missing (living people)
1953 births
21st-century Australian politicians
Australian Roman Catholics